Hakim Mosque is one of the oldest mosques in Isfahan, Iran. Completed in the mid-17th century, in the Safavid era, it is named after Moḥammad-Dāvud Khan Ḥakim (a court physician) who funded the construction.

The mosque was constructed between 1656 and 1663 and retained the "standard four ayvan plan and a two-storey arcade"  At the same time, however, it also bore a simpler structural pattern and brick and tile surface, compared to the ones that had been erected under Abbas I (1588-1629).

See also
 Islam in Iran

References

Sources

External links
 About Hakim Mosque
 Concerning the Masjed-e Jorjir, see H. Gaube et E. Wirth, Der Bazar von Isfahan, Wiesbaden, 1978, p. 203-204; O. Grabar, The Great Mosque of Isfahan, London, 1990, p. 47-48
 Loṭfallâh Honarfar, Ganjina-ye âsâr-e târikhi-ye Eṣfahân, Isfahan, 1344 Sh/1965, p. 612-620

Mosques in Isfahan
Safavid architecture